A Gota Suspensa (Portuguese for "The Suspended Drop") is the only release by A Gota Suspensa, a Brazilian experimental/progressive rock band formed in São Paulo in 1978 and which would acquire bigger fame after changing its name to Metrô in 1984. As such, it comprised Virginie Boutaud on vocals, Alec Haiat on guitars, Yann Laouenan on keyboards, Xavier Leblanc on bass and Daniel "Dany" Roland on drums, plus saxophonist Marcel Zimberg, who left the band after they changed their name and musical direction. (Leblanc was busy studying during the album's recording sessions though, and for that was replaced by Tavinho Fialho.)

Released in 1983 by independent label Underground Discos e Artes, A Gota Suspensa was a commercial failure, but received a fairly good critical reception, to the point of Epic Records offering them a contract. However, Epic also demanded them to change their sonority towards a more "accessible" direction, and so, in 1984, A Gota Suspensa changed its name to Metrô, removing the prog/experimental elements of their sonority.

The album is long out-of-print, being never re-released under CD format, but to this day it has a small cult following, with "A Gota" and "As Aventuras do Homem-Arame" being minor hits.

Track listing

Personnel
 Virginie Boutaud – vocals
 Daniel "Dany" Roland – drums
 Marcel Zimberg – sax, flute
 Yann Laouenan – keyboards
 Alec Haiat – guitar
 Tavinho Fialho – bass
 Vicente França – additional vocals (track 2)
 Michel, Sabrina – vocals (track 9)
 Eli Joory – dog (track 7)
 Luiz Antônio Ribas – production
 Edy Bianchi – recording, mixing
 Estúdio O que Pintar – cover art

References

External links
 A Gota Suspensa on Metrô's unofficial website

1983 debut albums
Portuguese-language albums
French-language albums
New wave albums by Brazilian artists
Metrô (band) albums